Turku is a city and former capital on the southwest coast of Finland at the mouth of the Aura River, in the region of Finland Proper (Varsinais-Suomi) and the former Turku and Pori Province (Turun ja Porin lääni; 1634–1997). The region was originally called Suomi (Finland), which later became the name for the whole country. As of 31 March 2021, the population of Turku was 194,244 making it the sixth largest city in Finland after Helsinki, Espoo, Tampere, Vantaa and Oulu. There were 281,108 inhabitants living in the Turku Central Locality, ranking it as the third largest urban area in Finland after the Capital Region area and Tampere Central Locality. The city is officially bilingual as  percent of its population identify Swedish as a mother-tongue.

It is unknown when Turku gained city rights. The Pope Gregory IX first mentioned the town Aboa in his Bulla in 1229 and the year is now used as the foundation year of Turku. Turku is the oldest city in Finland, and served as the most important city of the eastern part of the Kingdom of Sweden (modern-day Finland). After the Finnish war, Finland became an autonomous grand duchy of the Russian Empire in 1809, and Turku was made the capital of the grand duchy. However, Turku lost its status as capital only after three years in 1812, when Tsar Alexander I of Russia decided to move the capital to Helsinki. It was only after the last great fire in 1827 that most governmental institutions were moved to Helsinki along with the Royal Academy of Turku (Turun Akatemia) founded in 1640, which then became the University of Helsinki, thus consolidating Helsinki's position as the new capital. Turku continued to be the most populous city in Finland until the end of the 1840s, and it remains the regional capital and an important business and cultural center and port.

Because of its long history, it has been the site of many important events, and has extensively influenced Finnish history as the former capital city. Along with Tallinn, the capital city of Estonia, Turku was designated the European Capital of Culture for 2011. In 1996, it was declared the "Christmas City" of Finland. Also, Turku has been officially declared the Food Capital of Finland, because it holds a number of Finland's oldest, highest quality restaurants alongside a historically famous fish market, held twice a year. Turku's canteen and café culture has often been compared to French food culture, which is why Turku has also been perceived as "Paris of Finland"; this is also the reason for the Swedish saying: "Varför Paris, vi har ju Åbo!" ("Why Paris, we have Turku!")

Due to its location, Turku is a notable commercial and passenger seaport with over three million passengers traveling through the Port of Turku each year to Stockholm and Mariehamn.

Names and etymology

The Finnish name Turku originates from an Old East Slavic word, tǔrgǔ, meaning "market place". The word turku still means "market place" in some Finnish dialects.

The Swedish name Åbo may be a simple combination of å ("river; creek; large stream") and bo ("dwelling"). There is however an old legal term called "" (meaning roughly "right to live at"), which gave citizens (called "åbo") the inheritable right to live at land owned by the crown (å meant at or on in old Swedish, now på).

In Finnish, the genitive of Turku is Turun, meaning "of Turku". The Finnish names of organizations and institutes of Turku often begin with this word, as in Turun yliopisto for the University of Turku.

History
Turku has a long history as Finland's largest city and occasionally as the administrative center of the country, but for the last two hundred years has been surpassed by Helsinki. The city's identity stems from its status as the oldest city in Finland and the country's first capital. Originally, the word "Finland" referred only to the area around Turku (hence the title, "Finland Proper" for the region).

Early history
Archaeological findings in the area date back to the Stone Age and the area was densely populated in the Iron Age. The ancient cemeteries have been found in the region from the entire period from 550 to 1150. A few of the cemeteries were only in use in the beginning of the migration period, a few only from the Viking Age and a few only from the 12th century. In addition to cemeteries, remains of houses and villages from the end of the Iron Age, as well as ancient fotresses, have been found in the area. The oldest known road, Hämeen härkätie, connected to region and the Old Castle of Lieto to Tavastia in the 9th century at the latest. Early literary sources such as Al-Idrisi's world map from 1154 mentions Turku.

Swedish era

According to the permission granted by Pope Gregory IX in 1229, the episcopal seat was moved from Nousiainen to Koroinen, which is located near the current center of Turku. There is nothing to suggest that the actual city of Turku still existed at this point; however, the city was not founded on uninhabited land, but there were fields and probably also a peasant village. Since no reliable document has survived about the year of the city's founding, it has also been speculated that the city was founded by the joint initiative of the king, the bishop and the  founded in 1249 in the 1280s or 1290s.

Turku Cathedral was consecrated in 1300. During the Middle Ages, Turku was the seat of the Bishop of Turku (a title later upgraded to Archbishop of Turku), covering then the eastern half of the Kingdom of Sweden (most of the present-day Finland) until the 17th century. Even if Turku had no official capital status, it was for a long time the most important city in Finland as part of the trade and shipping of the Hanseatic League. In the 14th century, two-thirds of the city's burghers were German, but gradually the proportion of domestic burghers increased.

At the beginning of the 16th century, in connection with the disputes of the Kalmar Union, the Danes destroyed the city twice, in 1509 under the leadership of Admiral Otte Rud and in 1522 under the leadership of Admiral Søren Norby, until Erik Fleming's troops expelled the Danes from Finland in 1523. After the beginning of peace, Gustav Vasa, who had just become king, thoroughly got to know different parts of his kingdom, the center of the king's first visit to Finland being Turku Castle, where he lived during his visit. The new king also brought with him the religious reformation, and the first to preach the new doctrine was Petrus Särkilahti. Särkilahti's student Mikael Agricola, who is known as the father of Finnish literary language, continued the religious reform first as the headmaster of the cathedral school and later as the Bishop of Turku. Duke John (later John III), the son of Gustav Vasa, received the title of Duke of Finland and ruled his territory from Turku Castle before becoming next king of Sweden after his brother, Eric XIV.

In the aftermath of the War against Sigismund, the city was the site of the Åbo Bloodbath. After that, the 17th century began as more peaceful period for Turku, when the focus was mainly on emphasizing Turku's position as the center of a wide area by establishing numerous new administrative and school institutions. In 1640, the first university in Finland, the Royal Academy of Turku, was founded in Turku by order of Queen Christina. This project was also supported by Count Per Brahe, the Governor General of Finland, and Isaacus Rothovius, the Bishop of Turku. Turku was also the meeting place for the States of Finland in 1676.

Russian era

After the Finnish War, Sweden ceded Finland to Imperial Russia at the Treaty of Fredrikshamn in 1809. There was no resistance of any kind in Turku when the Russians marched into the city in October 1809 in connection with the Finnish War. Despite the occupation, life in Turku continued peacefully. The Court of Appeal of Turku continued its session when the Russians arrived, and later in the spring Jacob Tengström, the Archbishop of Turku and Finland, and the teaching staff of the Turku Academy swore an oath of loyalty to the their new ruler.

Turku became briefly the official capital, but soon lost the status to Helsinki, as Emperor Alexander I felt that Turku was too far from Russia and too aligned with Sweden to serve as the capital of the Grand Duchy of Finland. The change officially took place in 1812. The government offices that remained in Turku were finally moved to the new capital after the Great Fire of Turku, which destroyed a large portion of the city in 1827. After the fire, a new and safer city plan was drawn up by German architect Carl Ludvig Engel, who had also designed the new capital, Helsinki. The new city plan, based on a regular grid plan, was more spacious and fire-safe than before, and after the reconstruction, Turku was one of the most unified architecture in Europe. Turku remained the largest city in Finland for another twenty years.

In the middle of the 19th century, Turku was, after Helsinki, the most important craft city in Finland, but the Industrial Revolution with steam and electric machines was experienced in Turku only around 1900. The First World War provided a boost to the city's industry, as the export difficulties affected the wood industry, which Turku didn't have much of, and it was easy to get much-needed raw materials from neutral Sweden.

After independence

In 1918, a new university, the Åbo Akademi – the only Swedish-language university in Finland – was founded in Turku. Two years later, the Finnish-language University of Turku was founded alongside it. These two universities are the second and third to be founded in Finland, both by private donations.

The city enjoyed good connections with other Western European countries and cities, especially since the 1940s with Stockholm across the Gulf of Bothnia. In the 1960s, Turku became the first Western city to sign a twinning agreement with Leningrad in the Soviet Union, leading to greater inter-cultural exchange and providing a new meaning to the city's 'gateway' function. After the fall of communism in Russia, many prominent Soviets came to Turku to study Western business practices, among them Vladimir Putin, then Leningrad's deputy mayor.

As for architecture in the city, both the body of architectural styles as well as the prevalent way of living have experienced significant changes in the 20th century. While having survived relatively intact throughout the years of war 1939–1945, the city faced increasing changes in the 1950s and 1960s due to rising demands for apartments, the eagerness to rebuild, and most of all the new development of infrastructure (especially increased automobile traffic). The wooden one- to two-story houses that were the dominant mode of building in the city were mostly demolished in the 1950s and 1960s to both enable more efficient building and to ease vehicle traffic. This resulted in the destruction of buildings that were, in later decades, seen as beautiful and worth saving. Some individual buildings remain controversial to this day when it comes to their demolition in the decades after the war. For example, the building of  that stood on corner of the Market Square was torn down to make way for a large, multistory apartment building in 1959. The building was significant both for its location and history: having stood on one of the most valuable lots in the city center since 1878, the building had, for example, served as the first main building of the University of Turku.

Geography

The eastern side, where the Turku Cathedral is located, is popularly referred to as täl pual jokke ("this side of the river"), while the western side, where the Turku Castle is located, is referred to as tois pual jokke ("the other side of the river"). The city center is located close to the river mouth, on both sides of the river, though development has recently been expanding westward.

There are ten bridges over the Aura river in Turku. The Föri, a small ferry that transports pedestrians and bicycles across the river without payment, is a well known feature of the city.

With a population of approximately 200,000, the Turku Region (LAU 1) is the third largest urban region in Finland, after Greater Helsinki and the area around Tampere. The region includes, in addition to the city itself the following municipalities: Askainen, Kaarina, Lemu, Lieto, Masku, Merimasku, Mynämäki, Naantali, Nousiainen, Paimio, Piikkiö, Raisio, Rusko, Rymättylä, Sauvo, Vahto, and Velkua.

A more exclusive definition for the urban area is the city region of Turku with a population around 235,000 consisting of four major municipalities Kaarina, Raisio, Naantali, and Turku.

Administrative subdivisions

The city is divided into 78 districts and nine wards that do not function as local government units. There are, however, some projects that are based on the district divisions, particularly in the eastern part of the city, where unemployment is high in certain areas. The largest populated districts are Varissuo and Runosmäki. By area, however, Kakskerta and Paattinen, formed from former municipalities that were annexed to the city proper in the mid-20th century, constitute the largest districts.

As many of the small neighbouring municipalities from the north and south of the city were annexed during the mid-20th century, Turku is today shaped like an elongated pear. The city centre and most of the suburban areas lie in the middle, separated from the less densely populated northern rural areas by the Turku bypass, that forms part of European route E18. Islands such as Ruissalo, Hirvensalo and Kakskerta, forming the southern part of the city, are also sparsely populated and mostly contain summer residences, with the exception of some districts in Hirvensalo which are currently growing into upper-middle-class suburbs.

Climate

Situated by the Baltic Sea and sheltered by the islands of the Archipelago Sea, Turku has a humid continental climate (Köppen Dfb). Like much of southern Finland, the city experiences warm summers, with temperatures ranging up to 30 °C (86 °F), and relatively cold winters with frequent snowfall. Winter usually starts in early December, and spring in late March.

Precipitation in Turku averages  a year. The rainiest month of the year is August, when the city receives on average  of rainfall. In April, the driest month of the year, the figure is only .

The weather in the city itself is affected by the proximity of the sea, so the wintertime temperatures are often milder than those measured at the airport. The moderating impact of the sea helps oak maple and ash trees, which are quite rare elsewhere in Finland, to thrive by the areas along the shoreline and in the archipelago.

Demographics

At the end of 2021, the Turku region (including the economic districts of Turku and Åboland) had a population of 337,588, out of which 195,137 people lived in the city of Turku. This makes the Turku region Finland's third largest, after Helsinki and Tampere, being home to 6% of Finland's population. The city's population density is 794.4 inhabitants per square kilometre. The median age in the city is 42.1, lower than the national average of 43.6.

13.2% of Turku's population has a foreign-background. The largest groups are from Russia, Iraq and former Yugoslavia.

Economy

The business district in the city's economy is centred on the Port of Turku and other service-oriented industries. The city is also a renowned high tech centre – the Turku Science Park area in Kupittaa hosts over 300 companies  from the fields of biotechnology and information technology, as well as several institutions of higher learning that work closely with the business sector. This cooperative element is seen as a particularly important factor with regards to the city's expected future economic development, as outlined in the Turku Strategy that is published annually by the city council. 
At least the following major Finnish companies have their corporate headquarters in Turku: HKScan and Hesburger. Other major companies which have operations in Turku include Bayer, Fläkt Woods, Meyer Werft, Orion Corporation and Wärtsilä.

, over 280,000 people were registered as being without employment in Finland. This put June's numbers at 10.0 percent of the population, 0.8 percentage points higher than June 2014. Men's unemployment rate was 10.5 percent and women's 9.4 percent.

Culture

Cultural venues in Turku include several theatres, cinemas, and art galleries, and a city philharmonic orchestra. The city's cultural centre organises a number of regular events, most notably the Medieval Market in July each year. Turku is also the official Christmas city of Finland, and 'Christmas Peace' in Finland is declared on every 24 December from the Brinkkala Hall balcony. The Turku music festival and the rock festival Ruisrock (held on the island of Ruissalo) are among the oldest of its kind in the Nordic countries. The city also hosts another rock festival, Down by the Laituri, and one of the largest electronic music festivals in Northern Europe, UMF (Uuden Musiikin Festivaali, "New Music Festival"), in addition to a vibrant nightlife, centred on the Market Square.

The Åbo Akademi University maintains the Sibelius Museum, which is the only museum in Finland specialising in the field of music. Apart from these, there are also several historical museums that display the city's medieval period, such as the Turku Castle, which has been a functional historical museum since 1881, and the Aboa Vetus museum, built in the late 1990s over the 14th century archaeological site; countless excavations have been carried out in the city each year in order to gain more clarity on the city's birth history. The Luostarinmäki handicrafts museum, converted from residential buildings that survived the Great Fire of Turku in 1827, was the first Scandinavian venue to receive the "Golden Apple" tourism award.

Considered to be the most important religious building in Finland, the Turku Cathedral has borne witness to many important events in the nation's history and has become one of the city's most recognizable symbols with the Turku Castle. The cathedral is situated in the heart of Turku next to the Old Great Square, by the Aura River. Its presence extends beyond the local precinct by having the sound of its bells chiming at noon broadcast on national radio. It is also central to Finland's annual Christmas celebrations. It is also known as resting place for many remarkable bishops and captains of war as well as one Queen of Sweden, Catherine Månsdotter.

Turku was the European Capital of Culture in 2011, and the city council has approved numerous projects to boost the city's image in preparation for that status.

The Declaration of Christmas Peace has been a tradition in Finland from the Middle Ages every year, except in 1939 due to the Winter War. The declaration takes place on the Old Great Square of Turku, Finland's official 'Christmas City', at noon on Christmas Eve. The declaration ceremony begins with the hymn Jumala ompi linnamme (Martin Luther's Ein feste Burg ist unser Gott) and continues with the Declaration of Christmas Peace read from a parchment roll in Finnish and Swedish.

City rivalry with Tampere
Turku ostensibly has a long-standing mutual feud with the city of Tampere, the capital of Pirkanmaa and the third largest city of Finland, and they tend to compete for the title of being the "second grand city of Finland" after Helsinki. This hostility is largely expressed in jokes in one city about the other; prominent targets are the traditional Tampere food, mustamakkara, the state of the Aura River in Turku, and the regional accents. Like Turku, Tampere is well known as a food destination because of its food culture. Since 1997, students at Tampere have made annual excursions to Turku to jump on the market square, doing their part to undo the post-glacial rebound and push the city back into the Baltic Sea.

Sports

The city has two football teams playing at the top national level, the Veikkausliiga: FC Inter and TPS. TPS is one of the oldest football clubs in Finland. Both teams play their home matches at Veritas Stadion in the district of Kupittaa.

HC TPS of Turku is one of the most successful teams in Finnish ice hockey history. It plays in the Finnish top league, SM-liiga. HC TPS has won the national championship 11 times, the latest being from season 2009–2010. Gatorade Center, formerly named HK Arena, located in the Artukainen district, is used as the venue for HC TPS games.

The Paavo Nurmi Marathon is an annual sporting event in Turku, named after the world-famous runner Paavo Nurmi, who was born and raised in the city.

Finland's most successful tennis player, Jarkko Nieminen, was born and lives in the neighbouring county of Masku

Turku is also home to the Eagles Rugby Football Club (turkurugby.fi) who are part of the championship division of Suomen Rugbyliitto (SRL). They play games and train at Impivaara Jalkapallonhalli and Kuppitaanpuisto.

Turku Titans is a lacrosse club based in Turku with a relevantly successful history with three silver medals and one gold medal in the national lacrosse league in Finland. The Titans women's team has also had a successful history. The FIL U19 2012 World Lacrosse Championships were also held in the city.

Government and politics

Being both a regional and provincial capital, Turku is an important administrative centre, hosting the seat of the Archbishop of Finland and a Court of Appeal. Minna Arve has been the mayor of Turku since 2017. Since August 2021 her role as the mayor has been an elected office instead of a hired position.

The city council of Turku has 67 seats. Following the 2021 municipal election, the council seats are allocated in the following way: National Coalition Party 16 seats, Social Democrats 13, Left Alliance 11, Green League 10, True Finns 9, Centre Party 3, Swedish People's Party 3, Movement Now 1, and Christian Democrats 1. The current chair of the city board is Sini Ruohonen from National Coalition Party.

Results of the 2019 Finnish parliamentary election in Turku:

National Coalition Party   20.5%
Social Democratic Party   17.1%
Left Alliance   16.8%
True Finns   15.7%
Green League   13.8%
Swedish People's Party   5.5%
Centre Party   4.7%
Movement Now   1.9%
Christian Democrats   1.6%

Transport

For a city of its size, Turku has a moderate public transport network of bus routes, which is comparable to the bus network of similar-sized Tampere. The bus network is managed and supervised by the Turku City Region's Public Transport Committee (FÖLI), and is operated mainly by private companies. Bus traffic to and in the neighbouring municipalities of Kaarina, Lieto, Naantali, Raisio and Rusko are also handled by FÖLI. The bus rates are the same when traveling within these municipalities.

Rail traffic to and from Turku is handled by the Finnish national carrier, VR. The number of services has fallen and only the railways towards Tampere and Helsinki are now in use. The railway stations currently used for passenger traffic are the Turku Central railway station in Pohjola, and two smaller stations in Kupittaa and the Port of Turku.

There is no local rail traffic at the moment, as the city's popular tram services were discontinued in 1972, and the various local railway lines to neighbouring towns and municipalities were all abolished during the late 20th century.  However, there are plans for a light rail system in the Turku region in the near future. This system would more ably serve major suburbs of the city such as Varissuo and Runosmäki, as well as the neighbouring cities.

The State of Finland has announced plans to support Espoo with 30% of full expenses on a new metro rail, the Regional Council of Southwest Finland is going to use this as a test case for a new light rail network in Turku.

The Turku Bus Station and the Turku Central railway station are currently located in different places. The City of Turku is planning to combine these two in a new greater station complex in the near future. This new travel center will consist of a hotel and several shopping estates. This center will connect all public transportation from commuter trains to long-distance buses.

Turku's most significant highways for traffic are Highway 1 leading to Helsinki; Highway 10 leading to Hämeenlinna; Highway 9 leading to Tampere, Jyväskylä, Kuopio and Joensuu; Highway 8 leading to Pori, Vaasa and Oulu; and the Turku Ring Road, which protrudes circumferentially from Turku.

The airport is served by six passenger airlines, including airBaltic and SAS Scandinavian, and one cargo airline.

There are also daily ferry services from the Port of Turku to Sweden and Åland, operated by Silja Line and Viking Line. These are something of a Finnish cultural tradition (see ruotsinlaiva), and people often travel long distances across Finland to Turku just to take a cruise across the Gulf of Bothnia.

The Archipelago Sea boat traffic is handled by, among others, SS Ukkopekka, an old steamship that cruises on the route Turku-Naantali-Turku.

Turku is the only city in Finland to have three long-distance railway stations: Turku Central, Port of Turku, and Kupittaa.

Education

Turku has a longer educational history than any other Finnish city – the first school in the city, the Cathedral School, was founded along with Turku Cathedral in the late 13th century. The first university in Finland, the Royal Academy of Turku (now University of Helsinki), was established in the city in 1640. In 1820, the first school in Finland conforming to the Bell-Lancaster method was founded in Turku with the aim of making primary education more inclusive to the lower classes.

Turku is home to about 35,000 higher education students. There are two universities and several "polytechnics" in the town.

The Finnish University of Turku is the second largest university in Finland (18,000 students), as measured by student enrollment, and one of the oldest as well, having been founded in 1920. Åbo Akademi, founded 1918 as the second university of Finland, is one of Finland's  two Swedish-language universities. Turku School of Economics merged with The University of Turku in 2010, and Åbo handelshögskola, its Swedish counterpart, with Åbo Akademi 1980. The central hospital of Turku, Turku University Hospital, is affiliated with the university and it is used as a teaching hospital.

Turku University of Applied Sciences is the second largest polytechnic in Finland after Metropolia University of Applied Sciences. Also Novia University of Applied Sciences and Diaconia University of Applied Sciences have campuses in the town.

Turku is one of only two cities in Finland to have an established international school (the other city being Helsinki). Turku International School, located in the eastern district of Varissuo, has been operating since 2003. By an agreement signed between the city of Turku and the University of Turku, Turun normaalikoulu takes care of the teaching in the international school.

Media

The most widely read newspaper of Turku, and the area around it, is the daily regional morning newspaper Turun Sanomat, with a readership of over 70% of the population every day. Åbo Underrättelser, a Swedish language newspaper published in Turku, is the oldest newspaper in Finland, having been published since 1824. The free-of-charge Turkulainen newspaper is also among the most popular newspapers, together with the local edition of Metro International and the national evening tabloid Ilta-Sanomat. There are also a number of local newspapers such as Kulmakunta (for the eastern suburbs of Turku, including Varissuo and Lauste), and Rannikkoseutu (for the area around the neighbouring cities of Raisio and Naantali).

The first Finnish newspaper Tidningar Utgifne Af et Sällskap i Åbo, in Swedish, was started in Turku in 1771, as well as the first Finnish-language newspaper Suomenkieliset Tieto-Sanomat which was started in 1775.

The newspaper Turun Sanomat also operates a regional television station, called Turku TV. The Finnish national broadcaster Yleisradio screens local news, daily from Monday to Friday, for the Southwest Finland (including the regions of Southwest Finland and Satakunta) residents. All Finnish national TV channels are viewable and national radio channels audible in the Turku area. In addition, a number of local radio stations, e.g. Auran Aallot, Radio Sata and Radio Robin Hood are operational. Local public service radio stations are Yle Turun Radio in Finnish language (the regional version of Yle Radio Suomi) and Yle Vega Åboland in Swedish language (the regional version of Yle Vega).

Notable people

Rauno Aaltonen, rally driver
Teemu Brunila, singer, songwriter, musician and producer
Antti Buri, racing driver
Darude, dance musician, artist of the hit song Sandstorm
Alex Federley, political cartoonist and illustrator
Marcus Forss, football player, member of Finland's UEFA Euro 2020 squad
Johan Gadolin, chemist, physicist and mineralogist 
Janne Henriksson, football goalkeeper
Utti Hietala, bodybuilder
Vera Hjelt, Member of Parliament and social reformer
Lukáš Hrádecký, football goalkeeper, member of Finland's UEFA Euro 2020 squad
Kaapo Kakko, hockey player
Katja Kallio (born 1968), novelist, journalist, columnist and screenwriter
Joni Kauko, football player, member of Finland's UEFA Euro 2020 squad
Miikka Kiprusoff, former professional ice hockey goaltender who played for the Calgary Flames and San Jose Sharks during his NHL career
Mauno Koivisto, 9th president of Finland
Saku and Mikko Koivu, ice hockey playing brothers playing respectively in Montréal and Anaheim Ducks and Minnesota Wild as an alternate captain and captain
Christina Krook (1742–1806), educator
Joalin Loukamaa, a member of global pop group Now United
Agnes Lundell (1878–1936), Finland's first female lawyer
Erik Johan Löfgren, portrait painter
Baron C. G. E. Mannerheim, military leader and statesman
Marjatta Metsovaara, textile artist
Niklas Moisander, former captain of Finnish national football team
Michael Monroe, rock musician, the vocalist of Hanoi Rocks
Paavo Nurmi, The Flying Finn, 9 time Olympic Champion in long-distance running
Joni Ortio, professional ice hockey goaltender currently playing for HC Vityaz of the KHL
Elli Pikkujämsä, defender for KIF Örebro DFF and the Finland women's national football team
Rasmus Ristolainen, hockey player currently with the Philadelphia Flyers of the NHL
Johannes Rojola, developer of My Summer Car
Seppo Ruohonen (1946-2020), opera singer
Jiri "Linkzr" Masalin, Professional Overwatch player for the team Houston Outlaws and two time player for Finland in the Overwatch World Cup
Joona "Fragi" Laine, Former professional Overwatch player for the Philadelphia Fusion, and briefly for the Guangzhou Charge
Aleksi "Zuppeh" Kunti, former professional Overwatch player for the Florida Mayhem and team Gigantti
Joonas "Zappis" Alakurti, retired professional Overwatch player for the Florida Mayhem and team Gigantti
Jarno Saarinen, 1972 Grand Prix motorcycle racing world champion
Matti Salminen, bass singer
Henri Sigfridsson, classical pianist
Tabe Slioor, socialite, reporter and photojournalist
Herman Spöring Jr., explorer and botanist
Niilo Sevänen, vocalist and bass guitarist of Insomnium
Elsa Sylvestersson, ballet dancer and choreographer
Jere Uronen, football player, member of Finland's UEFA Euro 2020 squad
Jonne Valtonen, composer
Tony Vidgren, ice hockey player

International relations

Twin towns – sister cities

Turku is twinned with:

 Aarhus, Denmark (1946)
 Bergen, Norway (1946)
 Bratislava, Slovakia (1976)
 Cologne, Germany (1967)
 Constanța, Romania (1958)
 Florence, Italy (1992)
 Gdańsk, Poland (1958)
 Gothenburg, Sweden (1946)
 Kharkiv, Ukraine (2022)
 Rostock, Germany (1958)

 Szeged, Hungary (1971)
 Tartu, Estonia (2008)
 Varna, Bulgaria (1963)

In March 2022, Turku suspended the agreement with Saint Petersburg, Russia (twinning since 1953) due to the Russian invasion of Ukraine.

Co-operation agreements
Turku has co-operation agreements with:
 Tallinn, Estonia
 Tianjin, China

Gallery

See also

 Archipelago Sea
 Bishop Henry
 Christmas Peace
 Great Fire of Turku
 King's Road
 Medieval Market of Turku
 Pori
 Posankka
 Royal Academy of Turku
 The Tomten in Åbo Castle
 Turku Cemetery
 Turku sub-region

Other medieval cities and towns of Finland 
 Naantali
 Porvoo
 Rauma
 Ulvila
 Vyborg (now in Russia)

References

Sources
 Turku  at EuroWeather.

Bibliography
 Anttonen, Martti (ed) (1992). Täällä Suomen synnyinmuistot. Jyväskylä: Varsinais-Suomen maakuntaliitto. 
 Knuuti, Heikki et al. (1986). Kotikaupunkini Suomen Turku. Keuruu: Otava Publishing. 
 Virmavirta, Jarmo (2004). Finland's City of Turku. Keuruu: Otava Publishing.
 Turun kaupunki (2007). Muutoksen suunnat 3/2007. Retrieved 27 September 2007.

Notes

External links

 The city's official website at Etusivu.
 The website of the tourist organisation Turku TouRing at Turkutouring.fi.
 Turku – Finland's official Christmas City

 
Cities and towns in Finland
Grand Duchy of Finland
Port cities and towns of the Baltic Sea
Former capitals of Finland
Populated places established in the 13th century
Medieval Finnish towns